Stone Arch Bridge is a historic stone arch bridge located at Kenoza Lake, near Jeffersonville,  in Sullivan County, New York.  It was built in 1873 and is a solid masonry structure with an arched roadway supported by three arches made of hand cut stone.  It spans the East Branch Callicoon Creek.

It was added to the National Register of Historic Places in 1976.

See also
List of bridges and tunnels on the National Register of Historic Places in New York
National Register of Historic Places listings in Sullivan County, New York

References

External links

Road bridges on the National Register of Historic Places in New York (state)
Bridges completed in 1873
Bridges in Sullivan County, New York
National Register of Historic Places in Sullivan County, New York
Stone arch bridges in the United States